The Buhl LA-1 Bull Pup was a light sports airplane developed in the United States in 1930. It was a mid-wing wire-braced monoplane with fixed tailskid undercarriage and an open cockpit for the pilot. Buhl developed the Bull Pup as a cheap aircraft through which the company hoped to remain in business as the onset of the Great Depression was felt. However, as the economic situation worsened, it became evident that there was no demand for even such a basic aircraft; when production ceased in 1932, all aircraft still in stock were sold off at half price as the company folded.

Variants

 LA-1 Bull Pup
 LA-1A Bull Pup – version for competition flying with 28 ft wingspan
 LA-1B Bull Pup – version for high-altitude flying with 32 ft wingspan
 LA-1S Bull Pup – floatplane version

Specifications (L-1)

See also

 Buhl CA-1 Airster ; Buhl Airsedan

References

 
 1
 
 

 aerofiles.com

External links

 Diego Air & Space Museum Archives

Bull Pup
1930s United States sport aircraft
Racing aircraft
Single-engined tractor aircraft
Mid-wing aircraft
Aircraft first flown in 1930